Babe or babes may refer to:

 Babe, a term of endearment
 A newborn baby
 An attractive (especially female) person

People

Nickname
 Babe Adams (1882–1968), American Major League Baseball pitcher
 Babe Barna (1917–1972), American Major League Baseball left fielder
 Woolf Barnato (1895–1948), British financier and racing driver
 Babe Borton (1888–1954), Major League Baseball first baseman
 John H. Brown Jr. (1891–1963), American football player and United States Navy vice admiral
 Babe Clark (1889–1974), American football player
 Babe Dahlgren (1912–1996), American Major League Baseball infielder who replaced Lou Gehrig
 Babe Didrikson Zaharias (1911–1956), American multi-sport female athlete, most noted as a golfer
 Babe Dye (1898–1962), Canadian professional ice hockey forward
 Babe Ellison (1895–1955), Major League Baseball player
 Babe Frump (1901–1979), American offensive guard in the National Football League
 Babe Herman (1903–1987), American Major League Baseball right fielder
 Jacquelyn Kelley (1926–1988), member of the All-American Girls Professional Baseball League
 Babe Laufenberg (born 1959), American retired National Football League quarterback
 Howard "Babe" Lydecker (1911–1969), half of the Lydecker brothers, a movie special effects team
 Babe London (1901–1980), American actress and comedian
 Babe Martin (1920–2013), American Major League Baseball outfielder
 Babe McCarthy (1923–1975), American professional and collegiate basketball coach
 Babe Paley (1915–1978), American socialite and style icon
 Babe Parilli (1930–2017), American quarterback in the National, American, and Canadian Football Leagues
 Babe Parnell (1901–1982), American football player
 Babe Pinelli (1895–1984), American third baseman and umpire in Major League Baseball
 Babe Pratt (1916–1988), Canadian ice hockey defenseman
 Babe Russin (1911–1984), American jazz saxophonist
 Babe Ruth (1895–1948), American Major League baseball player
 Babe Scheuer (1913–1997), American football player
 Babe Siebert (1904–1939), Canadian National Hockey League player
 Emmett "Babe" Wallace (1909–2006), American singer, composer, actor
 Babe Ziegenhorn (1918–1970), American professional basketball player

Stage or ring name 
Oliver Hardy (1892–1957), American comic actor sometimes billed as "Babe Hardy" early in his career
 Babe the Farmer's Daughter, a ring name of professional wrestler and businessperson Ursula Hayden (born 1966)

Surname
 Jerome Babe (1837–1893), American inventor and miner
 Thomas Babe (1941–2000), American playwright

Places
 Babe (Bragança), a civil parish in the municipality of Bragança, Portugal
 Babe (Sopot), a village in Serbia

Arts and entertainment

Fictional characters
 Babe the Blue Ox, companion of the mythical lumberjack Paul Bunyan
 Babe, the title character of the Dick King-Smith book The Sheep-Pig
 Babe Carano, from Game Shakers
 Babe Carey, a character in the American soap opera All My Children

Films
 Babe (film), a 1995 Australian film based on the book The Sheep-Pig
 Babe: Pig in the City, the 1998 sequel
 The Babe, a 1992 film about baseball player Babe Ruth starring John Goodman

Music

Groups
 Babe (Dutch band), a girl-pop band
 Babe (Serbian band), a rock band
 BaBe, a Japanese pop duo

Songs
 "Babe" (Styx song), from the 1979 album Cornerstone
 "Babe" (Take That song), from the 1993 album Everything Changes
 "Babe" (Hyuna song), from the 2017 EP Following
 "Babe" (Sugarland song), from the 2018 album Bigger
 "Babe", by Emeli Sandé from the album Long Live the Angels

Other uses in arts and entertainment
 Babe (comics), a comic book by artist/writer John Byrne

Other uses
 Tropical Storm Babe (disambiguation), one Atlantic Ocean and six Pacific Ocean cyclones
 Bristol Babe, a single-seat biplane produced after the First World War
 B.a.B.e., a women's rights organization in Croatia
 Babe, a fragrance sold by Fabergé
A promotional model at video game conventions or comic book conventions

See also
 Babe Ruth (disambiguation)

Baby (disambiguation)
Bebe (disambiguation)
Babes (disambiguation)

Lists of people by nickname